Itaewon-dong is a dong (neighbourhood) of Yongsan-gu in Seoul, South Korea.

Description 

Itaewon is a melting pot of people from all over the world. According to Koh, M., & Malecki, E. J. (2016), Itaewon is well known as the most internationalized place in Seoul. For 50 years, it has attracted foreigners more than any other place in Seoul. At first, it served residential and commercial functions for American soldiers and foreign elites working in the embassies and transnational corporations due to the location of a US military base and most embassies in Korea. This historical condition draws over 2000 international residents to live in Itaewon from more than 80 countries. Due to these experiences, Itaewon has been the most common place to see foreigners. English is widely spoken here, unlike in other areas in Korea (p.5, para. 2).

Education
Schools located in Itaewon-dong:
 Itaewon Elementary School
 Bogwang Elementary School
 Seoul Digitech High School

See also 
Administrative divisions of South Korea

References

External links
 Yongsan-gu official website
 Yongsan-gu official website

 
Neighbourhoods of Yongsan District
Multiculturalism in South Korea